Ricardo Cortez (born Jacob Kranze or Jacob Krantz; September 19, 1900 – April 28, 1977) was an American actor and film director. He was also credited as Jack Crane early in his acting career.

Early years
Ricardo Cortez was born Jacob Krantz in New York City to Sarah (née Lefkovitz) and Morris Krantz. Along with his brother Stanley Cortez (born Stanislaus Krantz), he was raised in a Jewish family in New York City. (Vienna has been incorrectly cited as his birthplace.) He attended DeWitt Clinton High School in New York City.

Prior to entering the film business, he was an amateur boxer and worked on Wall Street as a runner.

Film career

Acting
Hollywood executives changed his name from Krantz to Cortez to capitalize on his handsome Latin-like features and the popularity of the silent film era's "Latin lovers" such as Rudolph Valentino, Ramon Novarro and Antonio Moreno. When it began to circulate publicly that Cortez was not actually Latin, the studios attempted to pass him off as French before a final Viennese origin story was promoted. 

Cortez appeared in over 100 films. He began his career playing romantic leads, and when sound cinema arrived, his strong delivery and New York accent made him an ideal heavy. While his main focus was character acting, he occasionally was able to play leading men. He played opposite Joan Crawford in Montana Moon (1930), and was the first actor to portray Sam Spade in the original pre-Code version of The Maltese Falcon (1931); the latter film was later overshaded by the 1941 remake with Humphrey Bogart in the lead. He co-starred with Charles Farrell and Bette Davis in The Big Shakedown (1934), and with Al Jolson and Dolores del Río in Wonder Bar (1934). In 1936, Cortez replaced Warren William as Perry Mason in The Case of the Black Cat.

Directing

Cortez directed seven films for 20th Century Fox from 1938 through 1940, all of them "program pictures made on a shoestring for the express purpose of filling the bottom half of the mandatory double bill ..." His first film as director was Inside Story, which was assigned to Cortez in the spring of 1938 but was not released until 1939. He also directed Chasing Danger, The Escape (1939), Heaven with a Barbed Wire Fence (1939), City of Chance (1940), Free, Blonde and 21 (1940), and Girl in 313 (1940).

Personal life
Cortez married silent film actress Alma Rubens on February 8, 1926. They had previously married on January 30, but it was invalid due to Rubens's divorce not being finalized. The couple separated in 1930, and she had sued him for divorce when she died of pneumonia on January 21, 1931. Cortez married Christine Conniff Lee on January 8, 1934, but they divorced in 1940. 

After retiring from the film business in the late 1950s, Cortez returned to New York, and began working as a stockbroker for Salomon Brothers on Wall Street.

Death
Cortez died in Doctors Hospital in New York City in 1977 at age 77 and was interred at Woodlawn Cemetery in the Bronx.

Recognition
Cortez has a star at 1500 Vine Street in the Motion Pictures section of the Hollywood Walk of Fame. It was dedicated on February 8, 1960.

Filmography

The Fringe of Society (1917) (scenes deleted) (film debut)
The Imp (1919) as Minor Role (uncredited)
The Gentleman from America (1923) as Minor Role (uncredited)
Sixty Cents an Hour (1923) as William Davis
Children of Jazz (1923) as Ted Carter
Hollywood (1923) as Himself
The Call of the Canyon (1923) as Larry Morrison
The Next Corner (1924) as Don Arturo
A Society Scandal (1924) as Harrison Peters
The Bedroom Window (1924) as Robert Delano
The City That Never Sleeps (1924) as Mark Roth
Feet of Clay (1924) as Tony Channing
This Woman (1924) as Whitney Duane
Argentine Love (1924) as Juan Martin
The Spaniard (1925) as Don Pedro de Barrego
The Swan (1925) as Dr. Walter, the Tutor
Not So Long Ago (1925) as Billy Ballard
In the Name of Love (1925) as Raoul Melnotte
The Pony Express (1925) as Jack Weston
Torrent (1926) as Don Rafael Brull
Volcano! (1926) as Stéphane Séquineau
The Cat's Pajamas (1926) as Don Cesare Gracco
The Sorrows of Satan (1926) as Geoffrey Tempest
The Eagle of the Sea (1926) as Capt. Sazarac
New York (1927) as Michael Angelo Cassidy
Mockery (1927) as Captain Dimitri
By Whose Hand? (1927) as Agent X-9
The Private Life of Helen of Troy (1927) as Paris
The Orchid Dancer (1928) as Yoanes Etchegarry dit Jean Barliave
 Ladies of the Night Club (1928) as George Merrill
Prowlers of the Sea (1928) as Carlos De Neve
The Grain of Dust (1928) as Fred Norman
Excess Baggage (1928) as Val D'Errico
 The Gun Runner (1928) as Julio
The Younger Generation (1929) as Morris Goldfish
New Orleans (1929) as Jim Morley
Midstream (1929) as James Stanwood
The Phantom in the House (1929) as Paul Wallis
The Lost Zeppelin (1929) as Tom Armstrong
Montana Moon (1930) as Jeff
Her Man (1930) as Johnnie
Illicit (1931) as Price Baines
Ten Cents a Dance (1931) as Bradley Carlton
Behind Office Doors (1931) as Ronnie Wales
White Shoulders (1931) as Lawrence Marchmont
The Maltese Falcon (1931) as Sam Spade
Big Business Girl (1931) as Robert J. Clayton
Transgression (1931) as Don Arturo de Borgus
Reckless Living (1931) as Curly
Bad Company (1931) as Goldie Gorio
Men of Chance (1931) as Johnny Silk
No One Man (1932) as Bill Hanaway
Symphony of Six Million (1932) as Dr. Felix 'Felixel' Klauber
Is My Face Red? (1932) as William Poster
Thirteen Women (1932) as Police Sergeant Barry Clive
The Phantom of Crestwood (1932) as Gary Curtis
Flesh (1932) as Nicky Grant
Broadway Bad (1933) as Craig Cutting
Midnight Mary (1933) as Leo Darcy
Torch Singer (1933) as Tony Cummings
Big Executive (1933) as Victor Conway
The House on 56th Street (1933) as Bill Blaine
The Big Shakedown (1934) as Dutch Barnes
Mandalay (1934) as Tony Evans
Wonder Bar (1934) as Harry
Hat, Coat and Glove (1934) as Robert Mitchell
The Man with Two Faces (1934) as Ben Weston
A Lost Lady (1934) as Ellinger
The Firebird (1934) as Herman Brandt
I Am a Thief (1934) as Pierre
The White Cockatoo (1935) as Jim Sundean
Shadow of Doubt (1935) as Sim Sturdevant
Manhattan Moon (1935) as Dan Moore
Special Agent (1935) as Alexander Carston
Frisco Kid (1935) as Paul Morra
The Murder of Dr. Harrigan (1936) as George Lambert
Man Hunt (1936) as Frank Kingman
The Walking Dead (1936) as Nolan
Postal Inspector (1936) as Inspector Bill Davis
The Case of the Black Cat (1936) as Perry Mason
Talk of the Devil (1936) as Ray Allen
Her Husband Lies (1937) as J. Ward Thomas
The Californian (1937) as Ramon Escobar
West of Shanghai (1937) as Gordon Creed
City Girl (1938) as Charles Blake
Mr. Moto's Last Warning (1939) as Fabian
Charlie Chan in Reno (1939) as Dr. Ainsley
Murder Over New York (1940) as George Kirby
Romance of the Rio Grande (1940) as Ricardo de Vega
A Shot in the Dark (1941) as Philip Richards
World Premiere (1941) as Mark Saunders
I Killed That Man (1941) as Roger Phillips
Who Is Hope Schuyler? (1942) as Anthony Pearce
Rubber Racketeers (1942) as Gilin
Tomorrow We Live (1942) as The Ghost, Alexander Caesar Martin
Make Your Own Bed (1944) as Fritz Alden
The Inner Circle (1946) as Duke York
The Locket (1946) as Mr. Bonner
Blackmail (1947) as Ziggy Cranston
Mystery in Mexico (1948) as John Norcross
Bunco Squad (1950) as Tony Weldon - aka Anthony Wells
The Last Hurrah (1958) as Sam Weinberg (final film)

Notes

References

Bibliography
Van Neste, Dan. The Magnificent Heel: The Life and Films of Ricardo Cortez. Albany, GA: BearManor Media, 2017.

External links

1900 births
1977 deaths
20th-century American male actors
American male film actors
American male silent film actors
American people of Austrian-Jewish descent
American stockbrokers
Burials at Woodlawn Cemetery (Bronx, New York)
Jewish American male actors
Male actors from New York City
Metro-Goldwyn-Mayer contract players
Stock and commodity market managers
20th-century American businesspeople
Film directors from New York City
20th-century American Jews